Al-Hamidiyya, was a Palestinian village in the District of Baysan. It was depopulated by the Jewish militias, precursors of the Israel Defense Forces, during the 1947–1948 Civil War in Mandatory Palestine on May 12, 1948. It was located five kilometres north of Baysan. It was attacked as part of Operation Gideon. The population in 1922 was 193, expanding to 255 in 1948.

History
The village takes its name from the sultan of the Ottoman Empire, Abdul Hamid II (1876–1909). In 1908, the Ottoman government confiscated lands privately owned by the sultan, including in the Baysan area, and leased them to tenants already residing there, possibly previously settled on his estates by the sultan. Some of the tenants were Bedouins and some fellaheen (peasants), with the former usually calling their village "Arab al-..." followed by the tribal name, which is not the case with Hamidiyya, which can mean that they were of fellah stock. Fellaheen would rather name their village after its founder, or after the location it had been built on.

British Mandate period
In the 1922 census of Palestine, conducted by the Mandatory Palestine authorities, Hamidiyeh had a population of 193; 1 Roman Catholic Christian and 192 Muslims, decreasing slightly in the 1931 census to 157, all Muslims, in 42 houses.

In the 1945 statistics the village was counted together with the Jewish kibbutz of Hermonim, with 220 Muslim Arab inhabitants in Al-Hamidiyya, and 100 Jewish inhabitants in Hermonim. Together they had a total area of 10,902 dunums, where Arabs owned 4,720 dunums of land as compared to 1,386 (about 13%) of the total land owned by the Jewish inhabitants. Of this land, Arabs used 164 dunams for citrus and bananas, 8 for irrigation and plantation, 4,395 for cereals, while 10 dunams were built–up, Arab land.

1948 War and aftermath
According to Benny Morris, kibbutzniks demanded-and often themselves carried out-the destruction of neighbouring villages for local (and selfish) reasons, as a means of blocking the return of the Arab villagers. For this reason a veteran local leader, Nahum Hurwitz of Kfar Gil'adi appealed in a letter in September 1948 for permission to destroy al-Bira, Kawkab al-Hawa, Jabbul, and al-Hamidiyya in the area for fear that they may be used by Arabs for military operations and to enable them to "take the village's lands, because the Arabs won't be able to return there". Following the war the area was incorporated into the State of Israel.

The Palestinian historian Walid Khalidi, described the village remaining structures in 1992 as: "Aside from the ruins of the village's houses (which have been reduced to cement rubble), a cemetery, and a few wells, only thorns are found on the site. The lands in the vicinity are used by Israelis for agriculture and grazing."

Kibbutz Chamadya, 2 km south, is close, but not on village land.

References

Bibliography

External links
Welcome To al-Hamidiyya
al-Hamidiyya, Zochrot
Survey of Western Palestine, map 9: IAA, Wikimedia commons
Al-Hamidiyya, from the Khalil Sakakini Cultural Center

Arab villages depopulated during the 1948 Arab–Israeli War